Montassar Omar Talbi (born 26 May 1998) is a professional footballer who plays as a centre-back for  club Lorient. Born in France, he plays for the Tunisia national team.

Club career
Born in France, Talbi began playing football with the youth academies of Paris FC and FC Les Lilas. His family had to move back to Tunisia, and at the age of 12 Talbi moved to the academy of ES Tunis, and moved up through the youth levels. Talbi made his professional debut with ES Tunis in a 0–0 Tunisian Ligue Professionnelle 1 tie with CS Sfaxien on 2 April 2017. On 20 June 2018, Talbi signed with Çaykur Rizespor in the Turkish Süper Lig.

On 9 August 2021, he signed a four-year contract with Russian Premier League club FC Rubin Kazan.

On 18 July 2022, Talbi signed a five-year contract with Lorient in France.

International career
Talbi is a youth international for the Tunisia 23s and made his debut in a 2–0 friendly loss to the Italy 23s on 15 October 2018. He debuted with the senior Tunisia national team in a 2–1 2021 Africa Cup of Nations qualification win over Equatorial Guinea on 28 March 2021.

He was later included for the squad of the 2021 FIFA Arab Cup, despite not being released by the Russian club. He reunited with the team following Rubin's 2–0 away defeat to Krylia Sovetov Samara and made his debut in the cup in the semi-finals against Egypt, which was won by Tunisia 1–0.

Career statistics

Honours
Tunisia
Kirin Cup: 2022
FIFA Arab Cup runner-up: 2021

ES Tunis
 Tunisian Ligue Professionnelle 1: 2016-17, 2017-2018
 Arab Club Champions Cup: 2017

References

External links
 
 
 

1998 births
Living people
Footballers from Paris
Tunisian footballers
French footballers
Association football defenders
Tunisia international footballers
Tunisia under-23 international footballers
2021 Africa Cup of Nations players
Espérance Sportive de Tunis players
Çaykur Rizespor footballers
FC Rubin Kazan players
FC Lorient players
Tunisian Ligue Professionnelle 1 players
Süper Lig players
Russian Premier League players
French expatriate footballers
Tunisian expatriate footballers
Expatriate footballers in Turkey
French expatriate sportspeople in Turkey
Tunisian expatriate sportspeople in Turkey
French sportspeople of Tunisian descent
Tunisian expatriate sportspeople in Russia
Expatriate footballers in Russia
Tunisian expatriate sportspeople in France
Expatriate footballers in France
2022 FIFA World Cup players